Frankie Lee (December 31, 1911 – July 29, 1970), was an American child actor. He appeared in 56 films between 1916 and 1925. Best remembered in the 1919 film The Miracle Man, he was the little boy on crutches healed by the phony faith healer just after Lon Chaney.

He is the older brother of child actor Davey Lee.

He was born in Gunnison, Colorado, United States.

Death
On July 29, 1970, Lee was shot in the head four times while he was asleep in his studio apartment in Los Angeles, California, 5 months before his 59th birthday. His cause of death was due to homicide.

Partial filmography

The Right to Be Happy (1916)
Her Husband's Faith (1916)
The Boss of the Lazy Y  (1917)
 The Bronze Bride (1917)
God's Crucible (1917)
 The Soul of Satan (1917)
 One Touch of Sin (1917)
Quicksand (1918)
 Cheating the Public (1918)
Daddy-Long-Legs (1919)
Rough Riding Romance (1919)
The Miracle Man (1919)
Bonds of Love (1919)
 The Westerners (1919)
Jinx (1919)
Nurse Marjorie (1920)
An Old Fashioned Boy (1920)
 Moon Madness (1920)
Godless Men (1920)
 The Poverty of Riches (1921)
The Foolish Matrons (1921)
 The Killer (1921)
Shame (1921)
The Swamp (1921)
 The Sin of Martha Queed (1921)
The Other Woman (1921)
Shattered Idols (1922)
 Heart's Haven (1922)
 The Scrapper (1922)
Deserted at the Altar (1922)
The Third Alarm (1922)
While Justice Waits (1922)
The Flame of Life (1923)
 The Barefoot Boy (1923)
 Children of Dust (1923)
The Age of Desire (1923)
The Hero (1923)
Poisoned Paradise: The Forbidden Story of Monte Carlo (1924)
The Golden Strain (1925)

Bibliography
 Holmstrom, John. The Moving Picture Boy: An International Encyclopaedia from 1895 to 1995, Norwich, Michael Russell, 1996, pp. 53–54.
 Katchmer, George A. A Biographical Dictionary of Silent Film Western Actors and Actresses, McFarland, 2002, p. 204.

External links

1911 births
1970 deaths
American male film actors
American male silent film actors
20th-century American male actors